The 2009 China Open Super Series was a top level badminton competition which was held from November 17, 2009 to November 22, 2009 in Shanghai, China. It was the twelfth BWF Super Series competition on the 2009 BWF Super Series schedule. The total purse for the event was $250,000.

Men's singles

Seeds
 Lee Chong Wei
 Lin Dan
 Taufik Hidayat
 Chen Jin
 Peter Gade
 Park Sung Hwan
 Simon Santoso
 Sony Dwi Kuncoro

Results

Women's singles

Seeds
 Wang Yihan
 Tine Rasmussen
 Wang Lin
 Zhou Mi
 Pi Hongyan
 Jiang Yanjiao
 Saina Nehwal
 Wang CHen

Results

Men's doubles

Seeds
 Koo Kien Keat / Tan Boon Heong
 Jung Jae-Sung / Lee Yong-Dae
 Markis Kido / Hendra Setiawan
 Mathias Boe / Carsten Mogensen
 Cai Yun / Fu Haifeng
 Alvent Yulianto Chandra / Hendra Aprida Gunawan
 Mohd Zakry Abdul Latif / Mohd Fairuzizuan
 Lars Paaske / Jonas Rasmussen

Results

Women's doubles

Seeds
 Cheng Shu / Zhao Yunlei
 Du Jing / Yu Yang
 Chin Eei Hui / Wong Pei Tty
 Ma Jin / Wang Xiaoli
 Ha Jung-Eun / Kim Min-Jung
 Tian Qing / Zhang Yawen
 Chang Hsin-Yun / Chou Chia Chi
 Chien Yu-Chin / Wang Pei-Rong

Results

Mixed doubles

Seeds
 Lee Yong-Dae / Lee Hyo-jung
 Zheng Bo / Ma Jin
 He Hanbin / Yu Yang
 Joachim Fischer Nielsen / Christinna Pedersen
 Diju Valiyaveetil / Jwala Gutta
 Xie Zhongbo / Zhang Yawen
 Songphon Anugritayawon / Kunchala Voravichitchaikul
 Sudket Prapakamol / Saralee Thoungthongkam

Results

References

External links
China Open Super Series 09 at tournamentsoftware.com

China Open Super Series, 2009
China Open (badminton)
China Open
Sports competitions in Shanghai